Fred Fulmer was an American football and basketball coach. He was the head football coach at Nebraska State Teachers College—now known as the University of Nebraska at Kearney–from 1922 to 1929, compiling a record of 28–31–9. He was also the head men's basketball coach from 1922 to 1930 and again from 1933 to 1935, compiling a 96–52 record.

Head coaching record

References

External links
 Nebraska–Kearney Hall of Fame profile

Year of birth missing
Year of death missing
Nebraska–Kearney Lopers football coaches
Nebraska–Kearney Lopers men's basketball coaches